Coloradia doris or Doris' pinemoth, is a species of moth in the family Saturniidae ("giant silkworm and royal moths"), in the superfamily Bombycoidea ("silkworm, sphinx, and royal moths"). The species was described by William Barnes in 1900. It is found in North America.

The MONA or Hodges number for Coloradia doris is 7725.

References

Further reading
 Ross H. Arnett. (2000). American Insects: A Handbook of the Insects of America North of Mexico. CRC Press.
 Tuskes, Paul M.; Tuttle, James P.; & Collins, Michael M. (1996). The Wild Silk Moths of North America: A Natural History of the Saturniidae of the United States and Canada. ix + 250.

External links
Butterflies and Moths of North America

Hemileucinae
Moths described in 1900